God & Beast is a 1997 album of Boyd Rice's NON.

It was released by Mute Records (UK) on CD.

Personnel
Boyd Rice wrote all tracks and provided vocals and sound construction.  Douglas P. provided vocals, played chimes and E-bow.  Rose McDowall provided vocals.  Dave Simmons played keyboards.

Liner notes
"In a Promethean sense, man is a God.  But on an even more profound level, man is a beast.  This primary contradiction has plagued mankind for millennia.  Man is a God.  Man is a beast.  These two aspects of his personality have been waging war with one another for countless centuries; a war whose casualties are seen everywhere and recognized nowhere.  But there exists, however, a long forgotten place in the soul where God and beast intersect.  To go to that place is to witness the death of one world and the birth of another...join me."

Track listing
 "God & Beast"
 "Between Venus & Mars"
 "Millstones"
 "The Coming Forth"
 "The Law"
 "Lucifer, The Morning Star"
 "Out Out Out"
 "Phoenix"
 "Total War"

There are two ghost tracks, the first being the reading of a poem, the second an instrumental piece. A sudden loud scream anticipates them after 13 minutes from the end of track 9.

External links
God & Beast at Discogs
[ God & Beast] at Allmusic

Boyd Rice albums
1991 albums
Mute Records albums